Khi Mao (ขี้เมา) was the debut album by Thai rock band Carabao.  It was released in 1981.

Track listing

1981 albums
Carabao (band) albums